Akka Pakka is a 2013 Kannada comedy film directed by UK Das. The film was produced by Lalitha Deep Arts. The film is loosely based on the 1989 American film See No Evil, Hear No Evil which was also the inspiration for Hindi movies Hum Hain Kamaal Ke and Pyare Mohan , Marathi movie Eka Peksha Ek, Tamil movie Andipatti Arasampatti and Kannada movie Baduku Jataka Bandi.

Cast 

 Ravishankar Gowda
 Tabla Nani
 Radhika Gandhi
 Jayasheela
 Lata
 Honnavalli Krishna

Soundtrack

Reception

Critical response 
A critic from The Times of India scored the film at 2 out of 5 stars and says "With a poor script and weak narration, the director fails to impress in any part of the movie. While Ravishankaragowda and Tabla Nani give a comic relief, Jayasheela steals the show with her excellent performance. It’s better if very little is discussed about the movie". A critic from Bangalore Mirror wrote  "The role of the speech impaired person he did in Snehitaru, though as one among the five leading men is better career-wise than playing the hearing impaired role in films like Akka Pakka. A smaller role in an A grade film is always better than playing the lead in a B grader".

References

External links 

2013 films
Indian comedy films
2010s Kannada-language films
2013 comedy films